Horne is a surname. Notable people with the surname include:

Alexander Robert Horne (1881–1953) Scottish engineer
Alex Horne (born 1978), British comedian and creator of Taskmaster
Alistair Horne (1925–2017), British historian 
Amelia Horne (1839-1921), (also known as Amy Haines and Amelia Bennett) British memoire writer
Barry Horne (activist) (1952–2001), British animal-rights activist
Barry Horne (footballer) (born 1962), Welsh footballer
Chris Horne (born 1994), Scottish musician
Cora Catherine Calhoun Horne (1865–1932) was a Black suffragist, civil rights activist, and an Atlanta socialite.
Charles Silvester Horne (1865–1914), British minister and politician
Dennis Morton Horne (1920–2015), English chess master
Des Horne (born 1939), South African and English footballer
Donald Horne (1921–2005), Australian writer and social critic
Edmond Henry Horne (1864–1953), Canadian prospector
Edward Horne (1835–1908), English clergyman and cricketer
Frederick J. Horne (1880–1959), a four-star admiral in the United States Navy
Henry Horne, 1st Baron Horne (1861–1929), British general
James A. Horne, British sleep scientist and co-developer of the Morningness–eveningness questionnaire
James H. Horne (1874–1959), American college sports coach
James W. Horne (1881–1942), American actor, screenwriter, and film director
James Welton Horne (1853–1922), Canadian land developer, businessman, and political figure
Jim Horne (model) (1917–2008), American model
John Horne (1848–1928), British geologist
John Horne (botanist) (1835–1905), British botanist
Kate Horne (born 1954), Canadian curler
Keith Horne (born 1971), South African golfer
Kenneth Horne (1907–1969), English comedian and businessman
Kenneth Horne (writer) (1900–1975), English writer and playwright
Lena Horne (1917–2010), American singer, actress and civil rights activist
Louise Horne (1912–2021), Trinidadian nutritionist and politician
Marilyn Horne (born 1934), American opera singer
Mathew Horne (born 1978), British actor and comedian
Matt Horne (born 1970), New Zealand cricketer
Patricia Horne (born c1929), Irish doctor
Rachel Horne (born 1979), Northern Irish newsreader and journalist 
Richard Henry Horne (1803–1884), English poet
Robert Horne (1871–1940), Scottish businessman, advocate and Unionist
Sharon Horne (disambiguation)
Thomas Horne (disambiguation), various people
Timmy Horne (born 1997), American football player
William S. Horne (1963-2022), American lawyer, judge and politician
Willie Horne (1922–2001), British rugby league playe

See also 
Audrey Horne Fictional character, Twin Peaks 
Benjamin Horne Fictional character, Twin Peaks 
Horn (surname)

English-language surnames